Wager can refer to:

Gambling
 Wager, the amount of a valuable staked when gambling on an event with an uncertain outcome, with the primary intent of winning money or material goods
 Legal wager, required by both parties at the preliminary hearing, under the early Roman Republic's Legis Actiones procedure
 Scientific wager, a wager whose outcome is settled by scientific method

People with the name
Wager Swayne (1834–1902), American military Governor
Sir Charles Wager (1666–1743), British Admiral
David Wager (1804–1870), New York politician
Gregg Wager (born 1958), American composer
Harold Wager (1862–1929), British botanist
Lawrence Wager (1904–1965), British geologist, explorer and mountaineer
Michael Wager (born 1925), American actor
Tor Wager, American neuroscientist
Walter Wager (1924–2004), American novelist

Films
 The Wager (1998 film), a short film
 The Wager (2007 film), a feature film

See also
 WAGR syndrome, a rare genetic syndrome